The 2013 Food City 250 was the 23rd stock car race of the 2013 NASCAR Nationwide Series and the 32nd iteration of the event. The race was held on Friday, August 23, 2013, in Bristol, Tennessee, at Bristol Motor Speedway, a 0.533 miles (0.858 km) permanent oval-shaped racetrack. The race took the scheduled 250 laps to complete. At race's end, Kyle Busch, driving for Joe Gibbs Racing, would dominate the race to win his 60th career NASCAR Nationwide Series win and his ninth win of the season. To fill out the podium, Brad Keselowski of Penske Racing and Austin Dillon of Richard Childress Racing would finish second and third, respectively.

Background 

The Bristol Motor Speedway, formerly known as Bristol International Raceway and Bristol Raceway, is a NASCAR short track venue located in Bristol, Tennessee. Constructed in 1960, it held its first NASCAR race on July 30, 1961. Despite its short length, Bristol is among the most popular tracks on the NASCAR schedule because of its distinct features, which include extraordinarily steep banking, an all concrete surface, two pit roads, and stadium-like seating. It has also been named one of the loudest NASCAR tracks.

Entry list 

 (R) denotes rookie driver.
 (i) denotes driver who is ineligible for series driver points.

*Withdrew prior to the event.

Practice 
The only two-hour and 50-minute practice session was held on Friday, August 23, at 9:00 AM EST.

Qualifying 
Qualifying was held on Friday, August 23, at 3:40 PM EST. Each driver would have two laps to set a fastest time; the fastest of the two would count as their official qualifying lap.

Eight drivers would fail to qualify: Joey Gase, Kevin Lepage, David Starr, Carl Long, Michael McDowell, Mike Harmon, Martin Roy, and Morgan Shepherd.

Full qualifying results

Race results

Standings after the race 

Drivers' Championship standings

Note: Only the first 12 positions are included for the driver standings.

References 

2013 NASCAR Nationwide Series
NASCAR races at Bristol Motor Speedway
August 2013 sports events in the United States
2013 in sports in Tennessee